Rodney Saulsberry is an American voice-over performer, actor, vocalist, announcer and author, known for his voice work on commercials (Twix, Zatarain's), his three books You Can Bank on Your Voice, Step Up to the Mic, Rodney Saulsberry's Tongue Twisters and Vocal Warm-Ups, the host of the popular podcast Success Talks With Rodney Saulsberry and the voice of Robbie Robertson in the 1994 animated TV series Spider-Man.

Saulsberry's first R&B album Rodney Saulsberry produced two Billboard-charting singles, "I Wonder" and "Look Whatcha Done Now".

Film and television soundtrack vocal performances

2011 Paranormal Activity 3 "Who Do You Love" (Writer, performer)
2010 The Bold and the Beautiful "Miracles" (Writer, Performer)
2010 The Bold and the Beautiful "I Like It Girl" (Writer, performer)
2010 The Bold and the Beautiful "I Gotta Lot of Friends" (Writer, performer)
2010 The Bold and the Beautiful "Love In Your Heart" (Writer, performer)
2010 Just Another Day “Better Than Before” (Writer, performer)
2009 Adventureland “I Need to Know” (Writer, performer)
1999 Michael Jordan: An American Hero “I’m So Glad You’re Mine” (Writer, performer)
1998 Prince of Egypt  “Playing with the Big Boys” (Background vocals)
1997 Sprung “We Are Love”  (Writer, performer)
1994 The Lion King “Hakuna Matata” (Background vocals)
1994 The Lion King “Circle of Life” (Background vocals)
1994 I'll Do Anything  “I’ll Do Anything” (Background vocals)
1992 Night and the City “Love Doesn’t Matter “ (Performer)
1988 Midnight Crossing “Alone” (Writer, performer)

Films, TV and audio
As an actor, his films include The Philadelphia Experiment (1984), Tango & Cash (1989), and the animated feature The Invincible Iron Man (2007). His voice work includes audiobooks and numerous film trailers (How Stella Got Her Groove Back, Finding Forrester, Crooklyn). He narrated the documentary Ax Handle Saturday: 50 Years Later (2010), Michael Jackson: Life of a Superstar (2009), Andy Bobrow's mockumentary The Old Negro Space Program (2004), a satire on Ken Burns' Baseball (1994), and the Marvin Gaye E! True Hollywood Story (1998). Currently, Rodney is the radio announcer voice for the New Orleans Pelicans Basketball Team 2012 Season.

Upscale Magazine regarded Saulsberry as "a voice to be reckoned with", while Black Enterprise magazine labeled him "the voice of choice for behind-the-scenes-narration."

On television, he has been seen in various guest-star roles, including the recurring role of Anthony Walker on The Bold and the Beautiful (1987) Law & Order: LA (2010) Taxi (1978), M*A*S*H (1972), Gimme a Break! (1981), 227 (1985), A team Hill Street Blues (1981), Dr. Quinn, Medicine Woman (1993), Without a Trace (2002) and Monk (2002). He was a series regular in the role of Jeff Johnson on Capitol (1982).

Saulsberry, who has composed original music for several productions, created the film, television and commercial music placement website, Tomdor Music, in the fall of 2011.

Animation 
The Little Engine That Could - Freight Train
Aaahh!!! Real Monsters - Ufwapo
The Animatrix: Matriculated - Chyron
Avatar: The Last Airbender - Additional voices
Duckman - Additional voices
The Invincible Iron Man - James "Rhodey" Rhodes
Minoriteam - Fasto
Skeleton Warriors - Additional voices
Spider-Man - Robbie Robertson
Static Shock - Phillip Rollins/Sparky
Xyber 9: New Dawn - Willy

Video games
CSI: Crime Scene Investigation: Hard Evidence - Everett Brower
Driver: Parallel Lines - Bishop
G.I. Joe: The Rise of Cobra - Heavy Duty
Grand Theft Auto V - The Local Population
Grey's Anatomy: The Video Game - Richard Webber
SOCOM 4: U.S. Navy SEALs - Wells
Star Trek: Starfleet Command III - Klingon Officer #2

Public appearances
Saulsberry has performed on the television variety show Soul Train and was the announcer for the 34th NAACP Image Awards and the 2003 Essence Awards. He was a guest presenter at the first annual Voice 2007 in Las Vegas and a featured speaker and panelist for two consecutive years at Voice Coaches Expo in Schenectady, New York. He has taught his voice-over workshop in various locations around the country that include, New York, Chicago, Nashville, Las Vegas and Los Angeles. He has also been a guest lecturer for the Theatre Department at Western Michigan University, California State University, Northridge and the Black Theatre Festival in Winston-Salem. Saulsberry has appeared at several book-signing events, including Borders and Barnes and Noble, and he is a regular featured panelist and workshop instructor for the SAG Foundation in support of the Don LaFontaine Voice-Over Lab. Rodney was a guest on the web series VO Buzz Weekly where he performed his motivational R&B single, "Miracles" from his album, "Better Than Before."

Discography
Solo Albums

Rodney Saulsberry (Allegiance) (1984) Produced by Stanley Clarke

Better Than Before (Tomdor) (2008) Produced by Rodney Saulsberry

Crazy About Your Love (GFI Records) (2014) Produced by Rodney Saulsberry

Christmas With Rodney Saulsberry (Tomdor) (2019) Produced by Rodney Saulsberry

Awards
In 2012, Saulsberry received a second nomination from the 44th NAACP Image Awards committee in the category of Outstanding Actor in a Daytime Drama Series for his role of Anthony on "The Bold and the Beautiful".

In 2011, Saulsberry received a nomination from the 42nd NAACP Image Awards committee in the category of Outstanding Actor in a Daytime Drama Series for his role of Anthony on The Bold and the Beautiful.

Saulsberry played the lead role in the Academy Award-winning short film Violet (1981).

References

External links

NPR: "Voice-Over Biz with Rodney Saulsberry"
Rodney Saulsberry's YouTube channel
Voice Over Times
Voice Chasers
Voice Coaches Expo

Living people
20th-century American male actors
21st-century American male actors
American male voice actors
African-American male actors
American male video game actors
American male television actors
American male film actors
American male soap opera actors
20th-century African-American people
21st-century African-American people
Year of birth missing (living people)
Place of birth missing (living people)